Hikmat is an Arabic origin name which has some variants such as Hikmet and Hekmat. It is used as a unisex given name and a surname. People with the name include:

Given name
 Hikmat Mizban Ibrahim al-Azzawi (1933–2012), Iraqi politician
 Hikmat Dib, Lebanese politician
 Hikmat Hasanov (born 1975), Azerbaijani military officer
 Hikmat Hashimov (born 1979), Uzbek football player
 Hikmat al-Hiraki (1886–1969), Syrian statesman 
 Hikmat Mizban Ibrahim (1933–2012), Iraqi politician 
 Hekmat Karzai, Afghan diplomat and academic
 Hikmat Mirzayev, Azerbaijani military officer
 Hikmat Ramdani (born 2001), Indonesian para badminton player
 Hikmat al-Shihabi (1931–2013), Syrian military officier
 Hikmat Sulayman (1889–1964), Iraqi politician
 Hikmat Abu Zayd (1922–2011), Egyptian academic and politician

Middle name
 Abdulqader Hikmat Sarhan (born 1987), Qatari taekwondo practitioner
 Ahmed Hikmat Shakir, Iraqi terrorist facilitator 
 Sharif Hikmat Nashashibi, British journalist

Surname
 Mohammad Ghani Hikmat (1929–2011), Iraqi sculptor and artist 
 Taghreed Hikmat (born 1945), Jordanian judge
 Uki Noah, (birth name: Mohammad Kautsar Hikmat; born 1981), Indonesian guitarist

Fictional character
 Hikmat, main character in the Egyptian movie Bint el-Basha el-Mudir 
 Hikmat Palpatine, one of the characters in the American drama television series 24

Arabic-language surnames
Arabic feminine given names
Arabic masculine given names